The Sixth Menzies ministry (Liberal–Country Coalition) was the 36th ministry of the Government of Australia. It was led by the country's 12th Prime Minister, Robert Menzies. The Sixth Menzies ministry succeeded the Fifth Menzies ministry, which dissolved on 9 July 1954 following the federal election that took place in May. The ministry was replaced by the Seventh Menzies ministry on 11 January 1956 following the 1955 federal election.

Paul Hasluck, who died in 1993, was the last surviving member of the Sixth Menzies Ministry; Hasluck was also the last surviving member of the Fifth Menzies Ministry. John McEwen was the last surviving Country minister.

Ministry

Notes

Ministries of Elizabeth II
Menzies, 06
1954 establishments in Australia
1956 disestablishments in Australia
Robert Menzies
Cabinets established in 1954
Cabinets disestablished in 1956